The Nokia 7610 is a Symbian OS smartphone introduced at CEBIT on 18 March 2004. It features a 1 megapixel camera (1152x864 pixels) with a design similar to 2003's Nokia 7600. It went on sale with a list price of €500 and came with a 64 MB MMC card. It runs on Nokia's Series 60 platform (version 2.1). It was marketed as a stylish and imaging device, and allowed direct Bluetooth photo printing. End-users can also use the 7610 with Nokia Lifeblog. Other pre-installed applications include the Opera Mobile web browser, RealPlayer pand Kodak Photo Sharing.

The Nokia 6670 is the same phone with a more conventional keypad layout, and slightly different pre-installed software, aimed at business users.

References

External links 

 Nokia 7610 Homepage (Web Archive Version)

Nokia smartphones
Mobile phones introduced in 2004
Mobile phones with user-replaceable battery